Lajos Sătmăreanu (also Ludovic Sătmăreanu, born 21 February 1944) is a former Romanian football player of Hungarian ethnicity.

Club career
Lajos Sătmăreanu, nicknamed Facchetti of the Carpathians was born on 21 February 1944 in Salonta, Romania and started to play football in 1958 at local club, Recolta. He made his Divizia A debut on 17 March 1963, playing for Crișana Oradea in a 4–2 away loss against Steaua București, shortly afterwards moving to play at neighboring team, Flamura Roșie Oradea in Divizia B for one season. After another Divizia B season, this time spent at ASA Târgu Mureș, Sătmăreanu went to play at Steaua for 10 seasons, winning one Divizia A title in the 1967–68 season, being used by coach Ștefan Kovács in 26 matches and also winning 5 Cupa României, scoring the last goal of the 4–0 victory against UTA Arad from the 1966 final. German club Hertha BSC wanted to sign Sătmăreanu after his performance at the 1970 World Cup, but Romania's communist regime refused to let him go. During his period spent with The Military Men he also played 20 games in European competitions, taking part in the 1971–72 European Cup Winners' Cup campaign, playing all six games as the team reached the quarter-finals by eliminating Hibernians and Barcelona, being eliminated after 1–1 on aggregate on the away goal rule by Bayern Munich. In 1975 he went to play at fellow Divizia A team, Bihor Oradea, leaving after half of season to go play in Divizia B for Progresul București, helping the team earn the promotion to the first league, making his last Divizia A appearance on 8 June 1977 in a 2–1 home victory against FCM Reșiţa, having a total of 306 matches with 6 goals scored in the competition.

International career

Lajos Sătmăreanu played for Romania in 42 matches, scoring one goal, making his debut under coach Bazil Marian in a 1–1 friendly against Uruguay, which took place in Montevideo on Estadio Gran Parque Central. He played six games at the successful 1970 World Cup qualifiers, also being used by coach Angelo Niculescu in all the minutes of the three group matches from the final tournament as Romania did not advance to the next stage. Sătmăreanu also played 9 matches at the 1972 Euro qualifiers, scoring one goal in the first quarter-finals game out of three against Hungary, who eventually defeated Romania in the third game, advancing to the final tournament. He played four matches at the 1974 World Cup qualifiers, his last match being a 1–0 victory against East Germany.

International goals
Scores and results list Romania's goal tally first, score column indicates score after each Sătmăreanu goal.

Coaching career
Lajos Sătmăreanu worked as a coach at the juvenile level, mostly at Steaua București where between 1977 and 2011 he taught and formed generations of players, which include Daniel Gherasim, Dan Petrescu, Marius Mitu, Robert Niță and George Ogăraru. Afterwards he coached juniors at Școala Privată de Fotbal "Vasile Matincă" for a short while, then he coached senior team Argeșul Mihăilești in the Romanian lower leagues for a few years, before returning to coaching juniors in 2016 at CSA Steaua București.

Honours
Steaua București
Divizia A: 1967–68
Cupa României: 1965–66, 1966–67, 1968–69, 1969–70, 1970–71
Progresul București
Divizia B: 1975–76

Notes

References

External links

1944 births
Living people
People from Salonta
Romanian sportspeople of Hungarian descent
Association football defenders
Romanian footballers
Olympic footballers of Romania
Romania international footballers
Liga I players
Liga II players
FC Steaua București players
FC Bihor Oradea players
ASA Târgu Mureș (1962) players
FC Progresul București players
CA Oradea players
1970 FIFA World Cup players
Romanian football managers